The Ministry of Justice of Senegal is in charge of the courts of the judiciary (excluding the Supreme court), training of magistrates and other judicial workers, monitoring human rights, avoiding cruel and inhuman punishment and fighting trafficking in persons

List of ministers (Post-1960 upon achieving independence) 

 Gabriel d'Arboussier (1960-1962)
 Andre Guillabert (1962-1963)
 Alioune Badara M'Bengue (1963-1968)
 Abdourahmane Diop (1968-1971)
 Amadou Cledor Sall (1972-1974)
 Alioune Badara M'Bengue (1974-1983)
Doudou N'Doye (1983-1985)
Abu Bakar Kamara (1984-1985)
Seydou Madani Sy (1986-1990)
Serigne Lamine Diop (1990-1993)
Jacques Baudin (1993-1998)
Serigne Diop (1998-2000)
Mame Madior Boye (2000-2002) [1st female]
 Serigne Diop (2002-2006)
 Chiekh Tidiane Sy (2007-2009)
 Madicke Niang (2009-2011)
 Chiekh Tidiane Sy (2011-2012)
Aminata Touré (2012-2013)
 Sidiki Kaba (2013-2017)
 Ismaila Madior Fall (2017–present)

See also 

 Justice ministry
 Politics of Senegal

References 

Justice ministries
Government of Senegal